William J. Philbin (26 January 1907 - 22 August 1991) was an Irish Roman Catholic Prelate.  From July 1962 until his retirement, he held the title Bishop of Down and Connor.

Early life and priestly ministry
William Philbin was born in Kiltimagh in County Mayo in the west of Ireland on 26 January 1907. 

At the age of 17 he went to St Patrick's College, Maynooth,  and was ordained to the priesthood for service in the Diocese of Achonry on 21 June 1931. He spent most of his ministry as a professor at St Patrick's College, Maynooth, and was appointed to the Chair of Dogmatic Theology in June 1936.

As a student, Philbin was the editor of Leabhar Nuidheacht, published at Maynooth, and later, as professor, he was the joint editor of the Irish Theological Quarterly.

Bishop of Clonfert
On 22 December 1953, Pope Pius XII appointed him 50th Bishop of Clonfert.   He was consecrated Bishop in St Brendan's Cathedral, Loughrea, in March 1954.  At the time he was seen as a daring, young, theologically engaged bishop and was invited to address many organisations and published several important lectures.  In 1962 he wrote how economic growth, so vital to his poor Western diocese, would be stimulated by Ireland joining the EEC.

He attended all four sessions of the Second Vatican Council, both as Bishop of Clonfert and later still as Bishop of Down and Connor.

Bishop of Down and Connor

Upon the death of Bishop Daniel Mageean in 1962, Pope John XXIII appointed him the 29th Bishop of Down and Connor. His stewardship of the diocese was marked in very large part by the outbreak of the Troubles in the late 1960s.

Bishop Philbin was often on the media and spoke forcefully to the BBC when one his priests, Fr. Hugh Mullan, was shot dead as part of the Ballymurphy massacre in August 1971.

Despite the civil conflict, often presented as a war between Christians, Philbin was rigidly opposed to Catholic support for any form of integrated education and there was a long-running row with parents in his diocese over provision of the sacrament of Confirmation to children who did not attend Catholic schools.

It was believed that Philbin acted without Vatican support for his position.

He was succeeded as Bishop of Down and Connor in November 1982 by The Most Rev. Dr Cahal Daly, the then Bishop of Ardagh and Clonmacnoise, who had been Philbin's Peritus at the Second Vatican Council.

Bishop Philbin died on 22 August 1991 in Dublin and was buried in St Peter's Cathedral, Belfast.

References

External links
 

1907 births
1991 deaths
20th-century Roman Catholic bishops in Ireland
Alumni of St Patrick's College, Maynooth
Participants in the Second Vatican Council
Religious leaders from County Mayo
Roman Catholic bishops of Clonfert
Roman Catholic bishops of Down and Connor